Tri Rahmad Priadi (born 9 April 1989, in Bukittinggi) is an Indonesian professional footballer who plays as a centre back for Liga 2 club PSCS Cilacap.

Club statistics

Honours

Club
Pelita Jaya U-21
 Indonesia Super League U-21: 2008-09; runner-up 2009-10
Persiraja Banda Aceh
 Liga 2 third place: 2019

References

External links
 Tri Rahmad Priadi at Soccerway
 Tri Rahmad Priadi at Liga Indonesia

1989 births
Association football defenders
Living people
Indonesian footballers
Liga 1 (Indonesia) players
Pelita Jaya FC players
Persiraja Banda Aceh players
People from Bukittinggi
Sportspeople from West Sumatra
21st-century Indonesian people